Marianne Horak (born 1944) is a Swiss-Australian entomologist who specialises in Australian Lepidoptera, particularly the phycitine and tortricid moths. She also did important research on the scribbly gum moths, during which eleven new species of Ogmograptis were discovered.

Horak was born in Glarus, Switzerland where she was inspired to study entomology from her childhood growing up in a valley in the Alps. She studied at the Federal Institute of Technology (ETH) in Zürich, earning her M.Sc. in 1970 and Ph.D. in 1983. She did extensive field work in New Zealand (1967–69), New Guinea (1971–73), and Indonesia (1985) before settling permanently in Australia.

She is the current editor-in-chief of Monographs of Australian Lepidoptera, chairperson of the Australian Lepidoptera Research Endowment, and honorary research fellow in Lepidoptera systematics at the Australian National Insect Collection at CSIRO, where she works as Lepidoptera curator and was head of Lepidoptera research until her retirement in 2010.

Horak has discovered several new species of Lepidoptera, including multiple species of Cadra, Heterochorista, and Ogmograptis. She also is the taxon authority for several genera, including Aglaogonia, Atriscripta, and Cnecidophora.

Horak was the first recipient of the J. O. Westwood Medal for excellence in insect taxonomy for "her outstanding monograph entitled The Olethreutine Moths of Australia (Lepidoptera: Tortricidae)". The moth species Coleophora horakae, Hilarographa mariannae, and Myrtartona mariannae are dedicated to her.

Horak is considered one of the worldwide leading experts on the systematics of Tortricidae.

She was previously married to the Austrian mycologist Egon Horak.

References

Living people
1944 births
People from Glarus
Swiss emigrants to Australia
Australian entomologists
Women entomologists
CSIRO people
Date of birth missing (living people)
Swiss entomologists